In topology, a branch of mathematics, a string group is an infinite-dimensional group  introduced by  as a -connected cover of a spin group. A string manifold is a manifold with a lifting of its frame bundle to a string group bundle. This means that in addition to being able to define holonomy along paths, one can also define holonomies for surfaces going between strings. The resulting manifold cannot be any finite-dimensional Lie group, since all finite-dimensional compact Lie groups have a non-vanishing . The fivebrane group follows, by killing .

More generally, the construction of the Postnikov tower via short exact sequences starting with  Eilenberg–MacLane spaces can be applied to any Lie group G, giving the string group String(G).

Intuition for the string group 
The relevance of the Eilenberg-Maclane space  lies in the fact that there are the homotopy equivalencesfor the classifying space , and the fact . Notice that because the complex spin group is a group extensionthe String group can be thought of as a "higher" complex spin group extension, in the sense of higher group theory since the space  is an example of a higher group. It can be thought of the topological realization of the groupoid  whose object is a single point and whose morphisms are the group .

Understanding the geometry 
The geometry of String bundles requires the understanding of multiple constructions in homotopy theory, but they essentially boil down to understanding what -bundles are, and how these higher group extensions behave. Namely, -bundles on a space  are represented geometrically as bundle gerbes since any -bundle can be realized as the homotopy fiber of a map giving a homotopy squarewhere . Then, a string bundle  must map to a spin bundle  which is -equivariant, analogously to how spin bundles map equivariantly to the frame bundle.

Fivebrane group and higher groups 
The fivebrane group can similarly be understood by killing the  group of the string group  using the Whitehead tower. Note map on the right is from the Whitehead tower, and the map on the left is the homotopy fiber.

See also 

 Gerbe
N-group (category theory)
Elliptic cohomology
String bordism

References

External links

From Loop Groups to 2-groups - gives a characterization of String(n) as a 2-group

What is an elliptic object?

Group theory
Differential geometry
String theory
Homotopy theory